The Ripley Machine Gun was a volley gun, an early precursor of the machine gun, which was patented in 1861 by Ezra Ripley. Although it is likely that it was never actually produced, it demonstrated a number of basic concepts that were employed in the design of the Gatling Gun that was patented the following year.

Method of action
The design, as patented, consists of nine fixed barrels attached to a limbers and caissons.  The weapon was loaded with a cylinder containing nine rounds of ammunition, arranged so that the rounds lined up with the barrels of the weapon. A firing handle was then attached, which locked the cylinder into place. 

The weapon was fired by rotating the handle, with the barrels firing in sequence. By rotating the handle quickly a high rate of fire could be achieved, or slowly, single shots. Once the nine rounds of ammunition in the chamber were expended, the cylinder could be removed for reloading and a fresh cylinder could be inserted into the breech.

The weapon was probably never built, and was passed over in favor of volley guns like the Billinghurst Requa Battery.

Notes

References
 George M. Chinn, The Machine Gun, Volume I, 1951

Early machine guns
Multi-barrel machine guns
Trial and research firearms